The 1970 ABA Playoffs was the postseason tournament of the American Basketball Association's 1969-1970 season. The tournament concluded with the Eastern Division champion Indiana Pacers defeating the Western Division champion Los Angeles Stars, four games to two in the ABA Finals.

The Indiana Pacers finished the season with the league's best regular season record (59-25, .702) before going on to win the ABA championship.  This same feat was accomplished by the Oakland Oaks during the prior season and by the Pittsburgh Pipers in the year before that.

The Pacers became the first ABA champions to return in the same form for the following season.  The Oakland Oaks became the Washington Caps for the 1969-1970 ABA season; the Pittsburgh Pipers had become the Minnesota Pipers after winning the ABA championship the prior season.

Roger Brown of Indiana was the Most Valuable Player of the ABA playoffs.

Western Division

Champion:  Los Angeles Stars

Division Semifinals

(1) Denver Rockets vs. (3) Washington Caps:
Rockets win series 4-3
Game 1 @ Denver:  Denver 130, Washington 111
Game 2 @ Denver:  Denver 143, Washington 133
Game 3 @ Washington:  Washington 125, Denver 120
Game 4 @ Washington:  Washington 131, Denver 114
Game 5 @ Denver:  Denver 132, Washington 110
Game 6 @ Washington:  Washington 116, Denver 111
Game 7 @ Denver:  Denver 143, Washington 119

(2) Dallas Chaparrals vs. (4) Los Angeles Stars:
Stars win series 4-2
Game 1 @ Dallas:  Los Angeles 115, Dallas 103
Game 2 @ Dallas:  Dallas 129, Los Angeles 121
Game 3 @ Los Angeles:  Dallas 116, Los Angeles 104
Game 4 @ Los Angeles:  Los Angeles 144, Dallas 138
Game 5 @ Dallas:  Los Angeles 146, Dallas 139
Game 6 @ Los Angeles:  Los Angeles 124, Dallas 123

Division Finals

(1) Denver Rockets vs. (4) Los Angeles Stars:
Stars win series 4-1
Game 1 @ Denver:  Denver 123, Los Angeles 113
Game 2 @ Denver:  Los Angeles 114, Denver 105
Game 3 @ Los Angeles:  Los Angeles 119, Denver 113
Game 4 @ Los Angeles:  Los Angeles 114, Denver 110
Game 5 @ Denver:  Los Angeles 109, Denver 107

Eastern Division

Champion:  Indiana Pacers

Division Semifinals

(1) Indiana Pacers vs. (3) Carolina Cougars:
Pacers win series 4-0
Game 1 @ Indiana:  Indiana 123, Carolina 105
Game 2 @ Indiana:  Indiana 103, Carolina 98
Game 3 @ Carolina:  Indiana 115, Carolina 106
Game 4 @ Carolina:  Indiana 110, Carolina 106

(2) Kentucky Colonels vs. (4) New York Nets:
Colonels win series 4-3
Game 1 @ Kentucky:  New York 122, Kentucky 118
Game 2 @ Kentucky:  Kentucky 113, New York 111
Game 3 @ New York:  New York 107, Kentucky 99
Game 4 @ New York:  Kentucky 128, New York 101
Game 5 @ Kentucky:  New York 127, Kentucky 112
Game 6 @ New York:  Kentucky 116, New York 113
Game 7 @ Kentucky:  Kentucky 112, New York 101

Division Finals

(1) Indiana Pacers vs. (2) Kentucky Colonels:
Pacers win series 4-1
Game 1 @ Indiana:  Kentucky 114, Indiana 110
Game 2 @ Indiana:  Indiana 121, Kentucky 110
Game 3 @ Kentucky:  Indiana 114, Kentucky 110
Game 4 @ Kentucky:  Indiana 111, Kentucky 103
Game 5 @ Indiana:  Indiana 117, Kentucky 103

ABA Finals

(1) Indiana Pacers VS. (4) Los Angeles Stars:
Pacers win series 4-2
Game 1 (May 15) @ Indiana:  Indiana 109, Los Angeles 93
Game 2 (May 17) @ Indiana:  Indiana 114, Los Angeles 111
Game 3 (May 18) @ Los Angeles:  Los Angeles 109, Indiana 106
Game 4 (May 19) @ Los Angeles:  Indiana 142, Los Angeles 120
Game 5 (May 23) @ Indiana:  Los Angeles 117, Indiana 113
Game 6 (May 25) @ Los Angeles:  Indiana 111, Los Angeles 107

External links 
RememberTheABA.com page on 1970 ABA playoffs
Basketball-Reference.com's 1970 ABA Playoffs page

Playoffs
American Basketball Association playoffs